Luther Hakunavanhu (born August 23, 1996) is a professional Canadian football wide receiver for the Calgary Stampeders of the Canadian Football League (CFL).

University career
Hakunavanhu played U Sports football for the York Lions from 2017 to 2019. He did not play in 2020 due to the cancellation of the 2020 U Sports football season.

Professional career
Hakunavanhu was drafted in the fifth round, 44th overall, in the 2021 CFL Draft by the Stampeders and signed with the team on May 18, 2021. He played in his first professional game on September 17, 2021, against the Hamilton Tiger-Cats, where he had four catches for 88 yards, including his first career reception on a 74-yard catch. In his third game, on October 16, 2021, Hakunavanhu scored his first career touchdown on a 16-yard pass from Bo Levi Mitchell in a game against the BC Lions.

References

External links
 Calgary Stampeders bio

1996 births
Living people
Calgary Stampeders players
Canadian football wide receivers
York Lions football players
Zimbabwean emigrants to Canada
Zimbabwean players of Canadian football